Thomas Walker Stubbs (11 September 1856 – 5 June 1899) was an English first-class cricketer and clergyman.

The son of Henry James Laurie Stubbs, he was born in September 1856 at Ashton upon Mersey, then in Cheshire. He was educated at Clifton College, before going up to Magdalen College, Oxford. While studying at Oxford, he made a single appearance in first-class cricket for Oxford University against Middlesex at Lord's in 1877. One of five Old Cliftonians to feature in the Oxford side that year, Stubbs batted once in the match and was dismissed for a single run in the Oxford first-innings by Alfred Stratford. With his right-arm roundarm fast bowling, he took the wicket of Augustus Nepean in the Middlesex first-innings, and followed this up by taking the wickets of Nepean and Stratford in their second-innings, to finish with match figures of 3 for 41. 

He married Evelyn Risley at Stow-on-the-Wold in 1878, with future Jack the Ripper suspect Montague Druitt among the attendees. Stubbs died at Stow-on-the-Wold in June 1899.

References

External links

1856 births
1899 deaths
People from Sale, Greater Manchester
People educated at Clifton College
Alumni of Magdalen College, Oxford
English cricketers
Oxford University cricketers